Bougousso is a town in north-western Ivory Coast. It is a sub-prefecture of Odienné Department in Kabadougou Region, Denguélé District, near to the border with Ivory Coast.

Bougousso was a commune until March 2012, when it became one of 1126 communes nationwide that were abolished.

In 2014, the population of the sub-prefecture of Bougousso was 6,722.

Villages
The 10 villages of the sub-prefecture of Bougousso and their population in 2014 are

References

Sub-prefectures of Kabadougou
Former communes of Ivory Coast